A prime meridian is an arbitrary meridian (a line of longitude) in a geographic coordinate system at which longitude is defined to be 0°. Together, a prime meridian and its anti-meridian (the 180th meridian in a 360°-system) form a great circle. This great circle divides a spheroid, like Earth, into two hemispheres: the Eastern Hemisphere and the Western Hemisphere (for an east-west notational system). For Earth's prime meridian, various conventions have been used or advocated in different regions throughout history. Earth's current international standard prime meridian is the IERS Reference Meridian. It is derived, but differs slightly, from the Greenwich Meridian, the previous standard.

A prime meridian for a planetary body not tidally locked (or at least not in synchronous rotation) is entirely arbitrary, unlike an equator, which is determined by the axis of rotation. However, for celestial objects that are tidally locked (more specifically, synchronous), their prime meridians are determined by the face always inward of the orbit (a planet facing its star, or a moon facing its planet), just as equators are determined by rotation.

Longitudes for the Earth and Moon are measured from their prime meridian (at 0°) to 180° east and west. For all other Solar System bodies, longitude is measured from 0° (their prime meridian) to 360°. West longitudes are used if the rotation of the body is prograde (or 'direct', like Earth), meaning that its direction of rotation is the same as that of its orbit. East longitudes are used if the rotation is retrograde.

History 

The notion of longitude for Greeks was developed by the Greek Eratosthenes (c.276195BCE) in Alexandria, and Hipparchus (c.190120BCE) in Rhodes, and applied to a large number of cities by the geographer Strabo (64/63BCEc.24CE). But it was Ptolemy (c.90168CE) who first used a consistent meridian for a world map in his Geographia.

Ptolemy used as his basis the "Fortunate Isles", a group of islands in the Atlantic, which are usually associated with the Canary Islands (13° to 18°W), although his maps correspond more closely to the Cape Verde islands (22° to 25° W). The main point is to be comfortably west of the western tip of Africa (17.5° W) as negative numbers were not yet in use. His prime meridian corresponds to 18° 40' west of Winchester (about 20°W) today. At that time the chief method of determining longitude was by using the reported times of lunar eclipses in different countries.

One of the earliest known descriptions of standard time in India appeared in the 4th century CE astronomical treatise Surya Siddhanta. Postulating a spherical earth, the book described the thousands years old customs of the prime meridian, or zero longitude, as passing through Avanti, the ancient name for the historic city of Ujjain, and Rohitaka, the ancient name for Rohtak, a city near the Kurukshetra.

Ptolemy's Geographia was first printed with maps at Bologna in 1477, and many early globes in the 16th century followed his lead. But there was still a hope that a "natural" basis for a prime meridian existed. Christopher Columbus reported (1493) that the compass pointed due north somewhere in mid-Atlantic, and this fact was used in the important Treaty of Tordesillas of 1494, which settled the territorial dispute between Spain and Portugal over newly discovered lands. The Tordesillas line was eventually settled at 370 leagues (2,193 kilometers, 1,362 statute miles, or 1,184 nautical miles) west of Cape Verde. This is shown in the copies of Spain's Padron Real made by Diogo Ribeiro in 1527 and 1529. São Miguel Island (25.5°W) in the Azores was still used for the same reason as late as 1594 by Christopher Saxton, although by then it had been shown that the zero magnetic deviation line did not follow a line of longitude.

In 1541, Mercator produced his famous 41 cm terrestrial globe and drew his prime meridian precisely through Fuerteventura (14°1'W) in the Canaries. His later maps used the Azores, following the magnetic hypothesis. But by the time that Ortelius produced the first modern atlas in 1570, other islands such as Cape Verde were coming into use. In his atlas longitudes were counted from 0° to 360°, not 180°W to 180°E as is usual today. This practice was followed by navigators well into the 18th century. In 1634, Cardinal Richelieu used the westernmost island of the Canaries, El Hierro, 19° 55' west of Paris, as the choice of meridian. The geographer Delisle decided to round this off to 20°, so that it simply became the meridian of Paris disguised.

In the early 18th century the battle was on to improve the determination of longitude at sea, leading to the development of the marine chronometer by John Harrison. But it was the development of accurate star charts, principally by the first British Astronomer Royal, John Flamsteed between 1680 and 1719 and disseminated by his successor Edmund Halley, that enabled navigators to use the lunar method of determining longitude more accurately using the octant developed by Thomas Godfrey and John Hadley.

In the 18th century most countries in Europe adapted their own prime meridian, usually through their capital, hence in France the Paris meridian was prime, in Germany it was the Berlin meridian, in Denmark the Copenhagen meridian, and in United Kingdom the Greenwich meridian.

Between 1765 and 1811, Nevil Maskelyne published 49 issues of the Nautical Almanac based on the meridian of the Royal Observatory, Greenwich. "Maskelyne's tables not only made the lunar method practicable, they also made the Greenwich meridian the universal reference point. Even the French translations of the Nautical Almanac retained Maskelyne's calculations from Greenwich – in spite of the fact that every other table in the Connaissance des Temps considered the Paris meridian as the prime."

In 1884, at the International Meridian Conference in Washington, D.C., 22 countries voted to adopt the Greenwich meridian as the prime meridian of the world. The French argued for a neutral line, mentioning the Azores and the Bering Strait, but eventually abstained and continued to use the Paris meridian until 1911.

The current international standard Prime Meridian is the IERS Reference Meridian. The  International Hydrographic Organization adopted an early version of the IRM in 1983 for all nautical charts. It was adopted for air navigation by the International Civil Aviation Organization on 3 March 1989.

International prime meridian
Since 1984, the international standard for the  Earth's prime meridian is the IERS Reference Meridian. Between 1884 and 1984, the meridian of Greenwich was the world standard. These meridians are physically very close to each other.

Prime meridian at Greenwich

In October 1884 the Greenwich Meridian was selected by delegates (forty-one delegates representing twenty-five nations) to the International Meridian Conference held in Washington, D.C., United States to be the common zero of longitude and standard of time reckoning throughout the world.

The position of the historic prime meridian, based at the Royal Observatory, Greenwich, was established by Sir George Airy in 1851. It was defined by the location of the Airy Transit Circle ever since the first observation he took with it. Prior to that, it was defined by a succession of earlier transit instruments, the first of which was acquired by the second Astronomer Royal, Edmond Halley in 1721. It was set up in the extreme north-west corner of the Observatory between Flamsteed House and the Western Summer House. This spot, now subsumed into Flamsteed House, is roughly 43 metres to the west of the Airy Transit Circle, a distance equivalent to roughly 2 seconds of longitude. It was Airy's transit circle that was adopted in principle (with French delegates, who pressed for adoption of the Paris meridian abstaining) as the Prime Meridian of the world at the 1884 International Meridian Conference.

All of these Greenwich meridians were located via an astronomic observation from the surface of the Earth, oriented via a plumb line along the direction of gravity at the surface. This astronomic Greenwich meridian was disseminated around the world, first via the lunar distance method, then by chronometers carried on ships, then via telegraph lines carried by submarine communications cables, then via radio time signals. One remote longitude ultimately based on the Greenwich meridian using these methods was that of the North American Datum 1927 or NAD27, an ellipsoid whose surface best matches mean sea level under the United States.

IERS Reference Meridian

Beginning in 1973 the International Time Bureau and later the International Earth Rotation and Reference Systems Service changed from reliance on optical instruments like the Airy Transit Circle to techniques such as lunar laser ranging, satellite laser ranging, and very-long-baseline interferometry. The new techniques resulted in the IERS Reference Meridian, the plane of which passes through the centre of mass of the Earth. This differs from the plane established by the Airy transit, which is affected by vertical deflection (the local vertical is affected by influences such as nearby mountains).  The change from relying on the local vertical to using a meridian based on the centre of the Earth caused the modern prime meridian to be 5.3″ east of the astronomic Greenwich prime meridian through the Airy Transit Circle. At the latitude of Greenwich, this amounts to 102 metres. This was officially accepted by the Bureau International de l'Heure (BIH) in 1984 via its BTS84 (BIH Terrestrial System) that later became WGS84 (World Geodetic System 1984) and the various International Terrestrial Reference Frames (ITRFs).

Due to the movement of Earth's tectonic plates, the line of 0° longitude along the surface of the Earth has slowly moved toward the west from this shifted position by a few centimetres; that is, towards the Airy Transit Circle (or the Airy Transit Circle has moved toward the east, depending on your point of view) since 1984 (or the 1960s). With the introduction of satellite technology, it became possible to create a more accurate and detailed global map. With these advances there also arose the necessity to define a reference meridian that, whilst being derived from the Airy Transit Circle, would also take into account the effects of plate movement and variations in the way that the Earth was spinning.
As a result, the IERS Reference Meridian was established and is commonly used to denote the Earth's prime meridian (0° longitude) by the International Earth Rotation and Reference Systems Service, which defines and maintains the link between longitude and time. Based on observations to satellites and celestial compact radio sources (quasars) from various coordinated stations around the globe, Airy's transit circle drifts northeast about 2.5 centimetres per year relative to this Earth-centred 0° longitude.

It is also the reference meridian of the Global Positioning System operated by the United States Department of Defense, and of WGS84 and its two formal versions, the ideal International Terrestrial Reference System (ITRS) and its realization, the International Terrestrial Reference Frame (ITRF). A current convention on the Earth uses the line of longitude 180° opposite the IRM as the basis for the International Date Line.

List of places

On Earth, starting at the North Pole and heading south to the South Pole, the IERS Reference Meridian (as of 2016) passes through:

Prime meridian on other planetary bodies

As on the Earth, prime meridians must be arbitrarily defined. Often a landmark such as a crater is used; other times a prime meridian is defined by reference to another celestial object, or by magnetic fields.
The prime meridians of the following planetographic systems have been defined:

 Two different heliographic coordinate systems are used on the Sun. The first is the Carrington heliographic coordinate system. In this system, the prime meridian passes through the center of the solar disk as seen from the Earth on 9 November 1853, which is when the English astronomer Richard Christopher Carrington started his observations of sunspots. The second is the Stonyhurst heliographic coordinates system, originated at Stonyhurst Observatory.
 In 1975 the prime meridian of Mercury was defined to be 20° east of the crater Hun Kal.
 Defined in 1992, the prime meridian of Venus passes through the central peak in the crater Ariadne.
 The prime meridian of the Moon lies directly in the middle of the face of the moon visible from Earth and passes near the crater Bruce.
 The prime meridian of Mars was established in 1971 and passes through the center of the crater Airy-0, although it is fixed by the longitude of the Viking 1 lander, which is defined to be 47.95137°W.
Jupiter has several coordinate systems because its cloud tops—the only part of the planet visible from space—rotate at different rates depending on latitude. It is unknown whether Jupiter has any internal solid surface that would enable a more Earth-like coordinate system. System I and System II coordinates are based on atmospheric rotation, and System III coordinates use Jupiter's magnetic field. The prime meridians of Jupiter's four Galilean moons were established in 1979.
Like Jupiter, Neptune is a gas giant, so any surface is obscured by clouds. The prime meridian of its largest moon, Triton, was established in 1991.
Titan is the largest moon of Saturn and, like the Earth's moon, always has the same face towards Saturn, and so the middle of that face is 0 longitude.
Pluto's prime meridian is defined as the meridian passing through the center of the face that is always towards Charon, its largest moon, as the two are tidally locked to each other. Charon's prime meridian is similarly defined as the meridian always facing directly toward Pluto.

List of historic prime meridians on Earth

See also

Notes

References

Works cited

External links

 "Where the Earth's surface begins—and ends", Popular Mechanics, December 1930
 scanned TIFFs of the conference proceedings
 Prime meridians in use in the 1880s, by country

Geodesy
Meridians (geography)
 
Cardinal Richelieu